Eslamiyeh District is in Ferdows County, South Khorasan province, Iran. At the 2006 National Census, the region's population (as a part of the Central District) was 12,610 in 4,136 households. The following census in 2011 counted 13,280 people in 4,468 households. At the latest census in 2016, the district had 14,267 inhabitants in 4,743 households.

After the census, Eslamiyeh District was established by combining Baghestan Rural District, Borun Rural District, and the city of Eslamiyeh. At the same time, Baghestan-e Olya's name changed to Baghestan and was raised to the level of a city. Baghestan-e Sofla became the new capital of Baghestan Rural District.

References 

Ferdows County

Districts of South Khorasan Province

Populated places in South Khorasan Province

Populated places in Ferdows County